David Thomas Charles Davies (born 27 July 1970) is a British politician who has served as Secretary of State for Wales since 2022 and Member of Parliament (MP) for Monmouth since 2005. A member of the Conservative Party, he chaired the Welsh Affairs Select Committee from 2010 to 2019. Davies also served as Parliamentary Under-Secretary of State for Wales from 2019 to 2022.

A vocal critic of the European Union, he supported Brexit in the 2016 membership referendum. Having previously questioned the scientific evidence for the role of human factors in global warming, Davies said in 2019 that he supported the UK government's intention to become carbon neutral by 2050 and that he fully accepted the link between carbon dioxide and climate change.

Background
Davies was born on 27 July 1970 in Newham, London, to Peter and Kathleen Davies. He was educated at Clytha School and Bassaleg School in Newport, Wales. After leaving school in 1988 he worked for the British Steel Corporation and served with the Territorial Army. He worked for his family in their shipping company, Burrow Heath Ltd, before entering politics. He was also a special constable with the British Transport Police for nine years.

He married Aliz Harnisföger, who is Hungarian, in October 2003 in Monmouth, and they have three children. A keen sportsman, Davies has fought in several charity boxing matches as "The Tory Tornado" and is a former president of the Welsh Amateur Boxing Association.

Political career 
He unsuccessfully contested the seat of Bridgend at the 1997 general election, finishing in second place 15,248 votes behind Win Griffiths. As an opponent of the concept
of a new Welsh assembly, Davies helped to set up the 'No' campaign in the devolution referendum, Davies gained a higher profile and decided to run as the Conservative candidate for Monmouth.  At the inaugural 1999 Welsh Assembly Election he was elected  to the National Assembly for Wales.

Davies speaks fluent Welsh after learning the language as a beginner when he was elected to the National Assembly for Wales. He was awarded the accolade of Welsh Speaker of the Year and was the first AM to address the Welsh Language Society, Cymdeithas Yr Iaith Gymraeg, in Welsh.

He was elected at the 2005 general election as member of the House of Commons for Monmouth, the seat he held in the Welsh Assembly. He defeated the sitting Labour MP Huw Edwards by 4,527 votes, and remains the MP for the constituency. On 18 May 2005 he made his maiden speech giving a history of his constituency from Geoffrey of Monmouth onwards. In Parliament he joined the Welsh Affairs Select Committee on his election. After the 2015 general election, he was returned unopposed the chairmanship of the committee.

In 2008, Davies was booed and slow hand clapped at a meeting of the National Black Police Officers Association. The delegates had expected the former shadow Home Secretary David Davis to attend after a mix up. He then criticised the National Black Police Association's race-based membership policy for not allowing white people interested in fighting racism to become full members and suggesting that they themselves could be guilty of racism.

Expenses
In 2009, The Daily Telegraph reported that Davies had claimed £2,000 of taxpayers' money and paid it to his family's haulage firm. Davies defended his actions in an interview, denying any wrongdoing and explaining to BBC Wales that his family's firm had been paid to provide postage and produce publicity material at short notice for the annual Monmouth show, that they had not profited, and that he had subsequently used a specialist company in London for the production of such material where the costs were significantly higher. 

In May of the same year, Davies became the first member of the Commons to voluntarily make his expense claims public. They were scrutinised by an independent panel which he had assembled and it emerged that Davies had claimed £475 for furniture for his London apartment, in addition to the monies paid to his family firm.

Welsh Affairs Committee
In June 2010, Davies was appointed Chairman of the Welsh Affairs Committee. He is a former member of the Home Affairs Select Committee and is an advocate of tough measures to deal with criminality. Davies is also Vice-Chair of the All-Party Parliamentary China Group and a member of the All-Party Parliamentary British-German Group. In January 2012, the Prime Minister David Cameron announced his appointment as a representative of the UK delegation to the Parliamentary Assembly of the Council of Europe.

July 2022 United Kingdom government crisis

On 7 July 2022, following the resignation of Secretary of State for Wales Simon Hart, Davies confirmed that  he "will not take the role".

October 2022 United Kingdom government crisis

On 25 October 2022, upon Rishi Sunak's appointment as Prime Minister, Davies was appointed Secretary of State for Wales, succeeding Robert Buckland.

Political views

Same-sex marriage
Davies opposed his Government's plans to introduce same-sex marriage in the United Kingdom, describing them as "barking mad" due to the possibility that they may alienate the Conservative party's traditional supporters; expanding on these views in a television interview he also expressed the opinion that "most parents would prefer their children not to be gay". He also criticised educating children about same sex relationships stating; “I just worry if children are going to be taught that [heterosexuality] isn’t necessarily the norm, and that you can carry on doing all sorts of other things, are we going to have a situation where the teacher’s saying, ‘Right, this is straight sex, this is gay sex, feel free to choose, it’s perfectly normal to want to do both. And you know, why not try both out?’ I mean, are we going to have that?”

Davies said he was not bigoted, offering the unusual defence that he had once fought an amateur boxing match against the "Pink Pounder", an openly gay boxer.

On 5 February 2013, Davies voted against in the House of Commons Second Reading vote on marriage equality in Britain. However, on 9 July 2019, Davies voted in favour of allowing same-sex marriage in Northern Ireland.

Transgender rights 
Davies has criticised reform of the Gender Recognition Act claiming that it would have "a profound impact on the rights of others to maintain sex-based boundaries, protections and rights”. In 2019 he claimed that trans rights were “overriding those of women” and that trans activism is “barking mad”.

In January 2018, Davies tweeted, "Somebody possessing a penis and pair of testicles is definitely not a woman ... This should be a biological fact not a matter for political debate." In response he was accused of being a "transphobe" by the LGBT+ Conservatives group, who described his comment as "abhorrent and out of kilter" with the Conservative Party.

Brexit
Davies campaigned for Brexit. In May 2019, while attempting a television interview on College Green, Davies was confronted by a pro-Brexit activist, clearly unaware of his identity, who accused him of being a 'remoaner', a 'liar', a 'snowflake' and not a Brexiteer. Davies said that he had voted to leave in the referendum and had voted for Theresa May's failed Brexit withdrawal agreement. The two argued as Davies accused her of having "a big mouth and "access to a keyboard" and attempted to record the incident on the body camera that was strapped around his torso while she simultaneously filmed him.

In October 2019, commenting on his interventions following the Speaker's refusal to permit a debate on the Government's Brexit agreement, The Guardian's political sketchwriter John Crace described Davies as "one of the dimmest people in parliament – even the sheep in his Welsh constituency have a higher IQ".

In December 2020, when it was announced that the EU and UK had reached a post-Brexit free trade agreement, Davies said: "This is a historic day, because we have shown now we can get control over our laws, our borders, over our money, and at the same time get access to the single market."

Climate change
Davies called for a debate in Parliament on climate change in 2013 in which he questioned the scientific evidence for the role of human factors in global warming. He went on to state that it is not proven that the carbon dioxide which has been released into the atmosphere is responsible for the relatively small amount of warming that has taken place since industrialisation. These claims are incorrect.

Davies claimed that "in the 1970s, everyone was predicting a forthcoming ice age". A study of the peer-reviewed literature on climate change published between 1965 and 1979 found just seven articles suggesting that the world might be cooling, and 44 proposing that it was likely to get warmer. The "emphasis on greenhouse warming", it concludes, "dominated the scientific literature even then".

Davies also criticised the government's approach to pursuing low carbon energy saying, "an unholy coalition of environmentalists working with big businesses have persuaded various British ministers to phase out cheap electricity from coal and gas and replace it with non-CO2 generating alternatives such as wind, solar and nuclear."

During a political discussion on climate change in 2016, Davies argued that temperature increases could be explained by the use of different thermometers. He stated that the level of global temperature increase was "perfectly possible to explain away, because we are not comparing "like with like". We are using slightly different temperature gauges, the areas in which we are using them have moved, some of the areas that they are in have changed over the years, and they can be subject to something called the urban heat island effect or to other natural factors. So there has not really been an increase since 1998."

In 2019, Davies said that he fully accepted the link between carbon dioxide and climate change. He also said he supported the UK government's intention to become carbon neutral by 2050.

In August 2019 Davies criticised the British band The 1975 for going on a world tour, accusing them of hypocrisy after producing a song about climate change.

Foreign policy 
He voted against the Cameron–Clegg coalition government in 2013 on the issue of British military intervention in the Syrian civil war.

Asylum
In May 2010, Davies was described by a rival Labour candidate, Hamish Sandison, as being on the "far right of the Conservative Party", which Davies described as an attempt to smear him as "some sort of Nazi" for raising concerns over immigration. A critic of the Coalition, Davies wrote a letter in 2012 to his constituents apologising for "incompetence at the highest levels of government" and accusing David Cameron of failing to listen to the concerns of backbenchers and the people who elected them.

Davies was criticised in 2015 for using the Charlie Hebdo terrorist attack to promote the Conservative Party election pledge to abolish the Human Rights Act 1998. Davies' claim that "under current laws, including the Human Rights Act, anyone can come to the UK and make a claim for asylum" was rebutted in The Guardian and in an article by Dr Mark Elliot at the University of Cambridge.

In response to the 2015 refugee crisis Davies said that most of the people attempting to enter the UK via Calais were not refugees fleeing war, but were economic migrants "mostly young men, mostly with mobile phones, chancing their luck". Davies attracted media attention in October 2016 with a tweet suggesting refugees to the UK should have dental checks to determine their age. His view was criticised by the British Dental Association which issued a statement describing the test as "inaccurate, inappropriate and unethical". The suggestion was also criticised by the British Association of Social Workers, and the test was also ruled out by the Home Office. In October 2016, Davies said that a child migrant arriving in the UK from Calais had "lines around his eyes and looks older than I am." Davies appeared on ITV's Good Morning Britain on 19 October to defend dental checks, but became engaged in a heated exchange with Piers Morgan, who accused Davies of demonising refugee children, a charge which Davies denied. Later that year, Home Office figures revealed that more than two-thirds of refugees arriving in the UK who had their age assessed were over 18.

In August 2017, Davies criticised a senior Met officer for suggesting police should prioritise non-English speaking victims of crime amongst other vulnerable groups for personal visits from officers. Davies described the suggestion as "appalling and discriminatory". Davies suggested that the police could save money by not paying for interpreters for non-English speaking victims of crime. When criticised by Matt Lucas on Twitter, Davies responded by calling him a "leftie luvvie comedian" and a "moron", stating: "You happily 'blacked up' for a sketch, then accuse others of racism."

Severn crossing
In August 2012, Davies said that he had been persuaded that continuing with a private operator was not in the interests of bridge users, and called on his own government to take state control of the two Severn crossings so motorists and businesses can have VAT-free tolls on a permanent basis. Davies said: "In normal circumstances I would be happy for a private company to run the bridges, but it's important to be pragmatic. It's clear that if the bridges are run by a state body, motorists and businesses would not have to pay VAT at 20% to drive across. The crossings are vital for the Welsh economy, and it's important to get them down as much as possible."

Special constable
Davies was sworn in as a Special Constable with the British Transport Police in March 2007. On his third patrol he searched a man 'acting suspiciously' and found a handgun.

In August 2011, Davies wrote about his experiences on riot duty and lamented that police were ordered not to go out alone in uniform for safety reasons. Davies had to return from a short holiday for the recall of Parliament to discuss the riots across England and also served on patrols in London that week in his role as a special constable. He called for the police to be encouraged to take tougher action during the riots.

He resigned in 2015, after serving nine years as a special constable, because of rules about police officers taking part in politics.

Nigel Evans trial
During the trial of fellow Welsh MP Nigel Evans, Davies gave evidence of his character, stating that Evans liked a drink and became jovial when intoxicated, unlike some people who have a dark side. Evans was Davies' best man at his 2003 wedding. In May 2013, Davies said of Evans: "He's been a good friend of mine for a lot of years. I am stunned by these allegations and find them impossible to believe." Evans was acquitted of sexual assaults in April 2014.

Other views 
In January 2010, Davies referred to some communities as having imported "barbaric views on women". Commenting on a rape case, Davies said that upbringing could be a major factor although he saw it as "not an Islamic issue... let me be quite clear, and it's not a racial issue".

In May 2012, during a phone-in on the Jeremy Vine show on BBC Radio 2, Davies told a member of the public that she should join the BNP after she advocated the compulsory teaching of the Welsh language in schools. On his web page, he states his opinion 'that people who come to this country should learn English and be expected to work and to fit in with our rules, culture and traditions'.

Davies is a critic of a number of national charities – Save the Children, RSPCA and NSPCC – that he regards as behaving in a politically motivated way, and was quoted in 2014 as saying that "this is part of a pattern of charities which focus more on lobbying the government on issues than on their causes."

In June 2015, Davies strongly criticised the planning and organisation of the first Velothon Wales event to be run in Wales which passed through his Monmouth constituency, arguing that business losses should be compensated for.

References

Sources

External links
David Davies MP official constituency website
David Davies MP Conservative Party profile
David Davies MP Welsh Conservative Party profile

 Welsh Affairs Select Committee, House of Commons

Offices held

1970 births
Living people
Secretaries of State for Wales
Conservative Party members of the Senedd
Conservative Party (UK) MPs for Welsh constituencies
Monmouth, Wales
People educated at Bassaleg School
People from Monmouth, Wales
UK MPs 2005–2010
UK MPs 2010–2015
UK MPs 2015–2017
UK MPs 2017–2019
UK MPs 2019–present
Wales AMs 1999–2003
Wales AMs 2003–2007
British special constables
Welsh-speaking politicians
British Eurosceptics
Members of the Privy Council of the United Kingdom